The Bielski Brothers (book) - a non-fiction book by Peter Duffy published in 2003
 The Bielski Brothers (film) - a 1993 documentary film directed by Arun Kumar